A list of films released in Germany in 1932, the last full year of the Weimar Republic.

A–L

M–Z

Documentaries

Short films

References

External links 
IMDB listing for German films made in 1932
Listing for films made in 1932, filmportal.de

German
Lists of German films
film